Macrohectopidae is a family of crustaceans belonging to the order Amphipoda.

Genera:
 Hellenis Petunnikov, 1914
 Macrohectopus Stebbing, 1906

References

Amphipoda